TVP3 Olsztyn is one of the regional branches of the TVP, Poland's public television broadcaster. It serves the entire Warmian-Masurian Voivodeship.

External links 
Official website

Telewizja Polska
Television channels and stations established in 2005
Mass media in Olsztyn